Kyle Robert Adams (born January 19, 1988) is a former American football tight end who played in the National Football League. He was signed by the Chicago Bears as an undrafted free agent in 2011. He played college football at Purdue.

Early years
Adams was born on January 19, 1988, in Wellesley, Massachusetts, to Anne and Robert Adams. He attended Westlake High School in Austin where he played football and basketball. He attended the same high school as another famous Purdue alumnus, Drew Brees.  His teammates at Westlake included future Philadelphia Eagles quarterback Nick Foles, Baltimore Ravens kicker Justin Tucker, and Los Angeles Rams linebacker Bryce Hager.  As a junior, Adams had eight receptions, and as a senior he caught nine passes for 100 yards and one touchdown.

He helped lead the team to district title every season he was there, and a quarterfinals appearance in 2003. In the classroom he was an Academic All-State and a  National Merit Scholarship finalist.

Adams committed to Purdue University on June 29, 2008. Adams wasn't heavily recruited as he only had one other FBS scholarship offer from Duke.

College career
During the 2006 season, his first year, Adams appeared in eight games, including one start. He made his Boilermakers debut  He caught his first two career passes for 17 yards at Northwestern on October 14 He later had his first career touchdown on a 25-yard pass from wide receiver Desmond Tardy at Hawai'i on November 25. For the season he had six receptions for 58 yards and one touchdown.

In 2007, he received the team's Newcomer Award, which is awarded to an offensive and defensive player who, in his first spring practice, makes the most progress.

Adams sustained a season-ending knee injury in the season opener against Northern Colorado in 2008. In 2010, Adams served as team captain, and led the team with 36 catches for 244 yards.

Statistics
Source:

Professional career

Pre-draft
Prior to the 2011 NFL Draft, Adams was projected to be undrafted by NFLDraftScout.com. He was rated as the twentieth-best tight end in the draft. Adams wasn't invited to the 2011 NFL Scouting Combine in Indianapolis, but he was able to showcase his talents during Purdue's annual Pro Day.

Chicago Bears
Adams was signed by the Bears as an undrafted free agent on July 26, 2011. He was released on September 2, 2013. On September 3, Adams was brought back by the Bears.  He was released again on September 9, 2013.

Tampa Bay Buccaneers
On November 27, 2013, Adams was signed by the Tampa Bay Buccaneers.

Personal life
Adams, a devout Christian, is a member of the Ephraim Orphan Project, an organization that provides aid to orphans in Haiti. In May 2012, Adams made a visit to the country to build a security fence as part of the construction of an orphanage, along with conducting sports camps and donating goods to other orphanages, his fifth visit. During his time at Purdue, he made three trips to Haiti as a member of the Fellowship of Christian Athletes, including a visit in February 2012.

References

External links
 Chicago Bears bio
 Purdue Boilermakers bio

1988 births
Living people
American football tight ends
Chicago Bears players
People from Wellesley, Massachusetts
Players of American football from Austin, Texas
Players of American football from Massachusetts
Purdue Boilermakers football players
Tampa Bay Buccaneers players